Infernal Love is the third major label album by the rock band Therapy? It was released on 12 June 1995 on A&M Records. The album was recorded at Real World Studios in Box, Wiltshire from January to March 1995.

Background 
The album was a major shift in direction from previous album Troublegum, moving away from punk-metal to create a broad epic cinematic soundscape with a strong melodic and rock grounding, with the songs being linked by ambient music pieces from DJ David Holmes. The album also contains a vocals-and-cellos version of "Diane" by American punk band Hüsker Dü, which also became a single. The cellist, Martin McCarrick, later joined Therapy? for several albums.

It was the final album to feature the original three-piece line-up, as drummer Fyfe Ewing departed in January 1996 following the European leg of the Infernal Love tour. The album reached number 9 in the UK Albums Chart and was certified Silver in the UK. It was also certified gold in Belgium.

Releases 
The album was originally released on limited edition red 12" vinyl, CD and Cassette. The Japanese release did not feature the "insanity" links by David Holmes, but included two bonus tracks. A remastered CD version of the album by Harvey Birrell was included in The Gemil Box, released on 18 November 2013. A two-disc Deluxe Edition version of Infernal Love was released by Universal Music on 31 March 2014.

Sonisphere Festival 
The band performed this album in its entirety at Sonisphere 2014.

Track listing

Personnel 
Therapy?
Andy Cairns – vocals, guitar
Fyfe Ewing – drums, percussion, backing vocals
Michael McKeegan – bass, backing vocals, guitar on "Bowels of Love"
with:
Martin McCarrick – cello
Simon Clarke – saxophone
Technical
Al Clay – backing vocals, producer, engineer
David Holmes – "Insanity" (as listed in the booklet)
Anton Corbijn – photography
Lewis Mulatero – photography
Jeremy Pearce – design
Simon Carrington – design

Singles 
"Stories" was released on 22 May 1995 with "Stories" (Cello Version) and "Isolation" (Consolidated Synth Mix). This single reached number 14 in the UK Singles Chart, and number 15 in the Irish Singles Chart.
"Loose" was released on 17 July 1995 with "Our Love Must Die", "Nice Guy" and "Loose" (Photek Remix). This single reached number 25 in the UK Singles Chart, and number 23 in the Irish Singles Chart. A digipack was released on 31 July 1995 with "Die Laughing" (live), "Nowhere" (live) and "Unbeliever" (live). The digipak charted at number 141 in the UK Singles Chart.
"Diane" was released on 6 November 1995 with "Misery" (Acoustic), "Die Laughing" (Acoustic), "Screamager" (Acoustic). A velvet digipack was released with "Jude the Obscene" (Acoustic), "Loose" (Acoustic), "30 Seconds" (Acoustic). This single reached number 26 in the UK Singles Chart, and number 20 in the Irish Singles Chart.
"Misery" was released as a radio single in the US on 11 November 1995 with "Evil Elvis" (The Lost Demo), "Knives" (live), "Stories" (live), "Isolation" (Consolidated mix).
"Stories" was re-released in the Netherlands in 1996 with "Loose" (live), "A Moment of Clarity" (live), "Our Love Must Die" (live). Live tracks recorded on 14 July 1995 in Arnhem, the Netherlands.
"Bad Mother" was released in Belgium in 1996 with "Disgracelands" (Acoustic Version), "Diane" (Acoustic Version), "Opal Mantra" (Acoustic Version).

Accolades 
 Included in Q Magazine's 50 Best Albums of 1995 (February 1996 issue).
 Number 100 in Kerrang's 100 Best British Rock Albums ever!

Charts

Certifications

References 

1995 albums
Therapy? albums
A&M Records albums